Christos Papageorgiou (10 March 1926 – 1997) was a Greek alpine skier. He competed in two events at the 1956 Winter Olympics.

References

1926 births
1997 deaths
Greek male alpine skiers
Olympic alpine skiers of Greece
Alpine skiers at the 1956 Winter Olympics
Sportspeople from Larissa